Maya Thakuri (born  2 July 1946) is a Nepali writer. She has published eight anthologies of short stories. Her stories have been translated in English, Hindi, Bengali, Tamil, and are a part of curriculum in various universities in India and Nepal. She is also a member of Nepal Academy.

Biography 
She was born on 2 July 1946 in Lucknow, India. She never received formal education and could not read or write until the age of 15. She learnt to read and write by her own. In 1974, she moved to permanently to Kathmandu with her husband, Damodar Sharma.

Notable works
Thakuri's stories focus on prejudices in women’s lives.  Her most renowned works are:
 Ama Januhos
 Najureko Jodhi - 1974, Sajha Publications
 Of a Lesser God
 Priyambada

References

External links
 Interview in Nepali and English 

Nepalese women novelists
1946 births
Living people
Nepali-language writers from Nepal
Nepalese writers
Nepalese short story writers
20th-century Nepalese women writers
21st-century Nepalese women writers